Epipyrops poligrapha is a moth of the family Epipyropidae.

References

External links

Moths of Asia
Moths described in 1910
Taxa named by George Hampson